David Robinson (born 20 March 1958) is an Australian former cricketer. He played three first-class cricket matches for Victoria between 1984 and 1985.

See also
 List of Victoria first-class cricketers
 List of Tasmanian representative cricketers

References

External links
 

1958 births
Living people
Australian cricketers
Tasmania cricketers
Victoria cricketers
People from Devonport, Tasmania